Henry Edward Dawe (1790–1848) was an English engraver and subject painter, the brother of the artist George Dawe

Life
Dawe was born at Kentish Town, near London, in 1790. He was taught by his father, Philip Dawe, the engraver, and he also studied in the schools of the Royal Academy. He assisted Turner on his Liber Studiorum,  and mezzotinted many of his brother's portraits. As a painter, he exhibited at the Society of British Artists, of which he was elected a member in 1830. He died at Windsor in 1848.

References

Sources
 

1790 births
1848 deaths
19th-century English painters
English male painters
English engravers
People from Kentish Town
19th-century English male artists